Shahrak-e Shahid Falahi (also Romanized as Shahrak-e Shahīd Falāḥī) is a village in Sardarabad Rural District, in the Central District of Shushtar County, Khuzestan Province, Iran. At the 2006 census, its population was 594, in 90 families.

References 

Populated places in Shushtar County